The 1958 Tipperary Senior Hurling Championship was the 68th staging of the Tipperary Senior Hurling Championship since its establishment by the Tipperary County Board in 1887.

Thurles Sarsfields were the defending champions.

On 21 September 1958, Thurles Sarsfields won the championship after a 4-11 to 3-03 defeat of Toomevara in the final at MacDonagh Park. It was their 21st championship title overall and their fourth title in succession.

Results

Final

References

Tipperary
Tipperary Senior Hurling Championship